Robert Ireland (c. 1532 – 6 October 1599) was an English politician.

He was a Member (MP) of the Parliament of England for Shrewsbury in 1559, 1563 and 1571.

References

1530s births
1599 deaths
English MPs 1559
English MPs 1563–1567
English MPs 1571